Dale Everett Arnold (born March 27, 1956) is a New England sportscaster. He hosts Boston Bruins broadcasts on NESN and co-hosted talk radio shows on WEEI until his retirement from radio on March 12, 2021, announced the day before. He was the Bruins' play-by-play announcer on NESN and has called Boston College Eagles football. He is the only person to have done play-by-play broadcasts for all five of the Boston area's major professional sports franchises.

Career
A Bowdoin College alumnus, Arnold began calling games for the school teams while a student there in the mid-1970s. In 1979, he succeeded Mike Emrick as the voice of the Maine Mariners. He joined the New Jersey Devils with Doc Emrick as their radio announcer in 1986, before returning to New England two years later.  Arnold called New England Patriots games from 1988–90 and provided play-by-play coverage for Bruins home games from 1995–2007. In July 2007, he was replaced by former ESPN sportscaster Jack Edwards as the Bruins' play-by-play telecaster.

Arnold has been with WEEI radio since its inception in 1991 at 590 kHz, then as Sportsradio 850, then moving to WEEI-FM with other locally produced programs. He first hosted a late-morning show from 10 AM to 1 PM, before being teamed up with Eddie Andelman on a show called The A-Team. After Andelman's departure from WEEI in 2001, Arnold was paired with former television sportscaster Bob Neumeier on the Dale & Neumy Show.  After Neumeier left the station in 2005, Arnold paired with former Boston Globe columnist Michael Holley on The Dale & Holley Show from 10 AM to 2 PM. On February 11, 2008, Entercom put Arnold on the four-person Boston Red Sox radio broadcast team, working with Joe Castiglione when Dave O'Brien was on ESPN. In February 2011, WEEI shifted Arnold to weekend duty while Holley became co-host of the Big Show during afternoon drive time. Arnold subsequently hosted a Sunday morning talk show on WEEI with Steve Buckley. In the 2011–12 season, Arnold returned to NESN as the in-studio host for Bruins broadcasts, anchoring pregame, intermission and postgame coverage.  On April 1, 2014, WEEI-FM relaunched The Dale & Holley Show from 2-6 PM.  Arnold worked without a contract but, after the show's Nielsen ratings improved 59 percent, he was given a multi-year contract in January 2015. From November 2014 to November 2016, Jerry Thornton of Barstool Sports was added as the third host and comedian.  He would later return to Barstool Sports full-time. Veteran radio host Rich Keefe of WBZ-FM and #DORK Podcast was hired to replace Thornton. Daily and weekly guests of The Dale & Holley with Keefe Show included Terry Francona, Mike Milbury, Bill Belichick, Michael Irvin, Peter King, Patrick Chung, Matthew Slater, Dont'a Hightower, Vince Wilfork, Chris Mannix, Jackie MacMullan, Trent Dilfer, and Pierre McGuire.

On February 28, 2018, the show was renamed The Dale & Keefe Show after longtime co-host Michael Holley announced at the 5 o'clock hour that he would be leaving WEEI immediately after the show to pursue a full-time television position with NBC Sports Boston. It was an emotional time for Arnold and Holley, having spent 10 years together as radio partners and best friends on and off the air. Holley is a close family friend of the Arnold family and attended Dale's son Taylor's wedding in New Orleans in October 2015. On August 13, 2018, WEEI shook up their lineup, moving The Dale & Keefe Show to the midday slot, and moving the midday show, Ordway, Merloni, and Fauria, featuring hosts Glenn Ordway, Lou Merloni, and Christian Fauria, to the afternoon drive time slot.

Arnold's voice can be heard during several NFL Top 10 and A Football Life documentaries on the NFL Network.

Arnold announced on March 11, 2021, that the following day's broadcast, on March 12, 2021, would be his last. Arnold worked nearly 30 years at WEEI,but would continue hosting Bruins broadcasts, part time.

Miscellanea 
Arnold's most famous line as a play-by-play announcer came in a 1988 game at Sullivan Stadium between the Patriots and the Indianapolis Colts when Doug Flutie ran in the winning touchdown in the final 30 seconds; the crowd erupted, and Arnold described the scene as "This place has gone icky balooky!"

Personal life 
Arnold lives in Bellingham, Massachusetts, with his wife, Susan. They have three children: Taylor, Alysha and Brianna. Arnold grew up in Maine and Minnesota prior to attending Bowdoin College. His son, Taylor Arnold, is a professor at University of Richmond.

Awards and recognition 
Arnold is a three-time Regional Emmy Award winner.

References

External links 
 WEEI Dale & Keefe
 WEEI Audio Vault: Dale & Holley

1956 births
Living people
American Hockey League broadcasters
American radio sports announcers
Association football commentators
Boston sportscasters
Boston Bruins announcers
Boston Celtics announcers
Boston College Eagles football announcers
Place of birth missing (living people)
Boston Red Sox announcers
Bowdoin College alumni
Major League Baseball broadcasters
National Basketball Association broadcasters
National Football League announcers
National Hockey League broadcasters
New England Patriots announcers
New Jersey Devils announcers
People from Brunswick, Maine
Regional Emmy Award winners